Yaşam Kavgası is a 1978 Turkish drama film, directed by Halit Refiğ and starring Fatma Girik, Can Gürzap, and Ahmet Mekin.

References

External links
Yaşam Kavgası at the Internet Movie Database

1978 films
Turkish drama films
1978 drama films
Films directed by Halit Refiğ